The pair skating competition of the 2010 Winter Olympics was held at the Pacific Coliseum in Vancouver, British Columbia, Canada. The short program was held on February 14, 2010 and the free skating was held on February 15, 2010.

Shen Xue and Zhao Hongbo (CHN) won the gold medal. This was the first time since 1960 that a Russian, Soviet, or Unified Team (CIS) flagged team did not win the gold medal.

Records
Prior to the competition, the existing ISU best scores were:

The following ISU best scores were set during the competition:

Results

Short program
The pairs short program was held on February 14.

Free skating
The pairs free skate was held on February 15.

Overall

Judges and officials
Referee:
 Pekka Leskinen

Technical Controller:
 Susan Lynch

Technical Specialist:
 David Moellenkamp

Assistant Technical Specialist:
 Simon Briggs

Judges (SP):
 Wang Yumin
 Irina Medvedeva
 Karen Archer
 Andrea Derby
 Alexander Kogan
 Taffy Holliday
 Heinz-Ulrich Walther
 Markus Germann
 Florence Vuylsteker

Judges (FS):
 Anna Sierocka
 Nikolai Salnikov
 Franco Benini
 Albert Zaydman
 Heinz-Ulrich Walther
 Irina Medvedeva
 Andrea Derby
 Taffy Holliday
 Wang Yumin
 Markus Germann

References

External links
 2010 Winter Olympics results: Pairs, from https://web.archive.org/web/20100222080013/http://www.vancouver2010.com/ retrieved 2010-02-15.
 Vancouver 2010: Figure Skating 

Pair
2010
2010 in figure skating
Mixed events at the 2010 Winter Olympics